For the article concerning Hawaii's environment, see Environment of Hawaii

Environment Hawaii is a monthly newsletter published in Hilo, Hawaii. It focuses on investigative reporting about Hawaii's environment. The newsletter made its debut in July 1990.

External links
Official site

Mass media in Hawaii